Louis/Lewis Marshall (birth unknown – death unknown) was an English professional rugby league footballer who played in the 1910s and 1920s.

Playing career

International honours
Louis/Lewis Marshall won a cap for England while at Bramley, he played  in England's 2-13 defeat by Wales at Central Park, Wigan on Wednesday 7 February 1923.

Club career

Note
The englandrl.co.uk website states Marshall's forename as being Louis, the Godfrey Phillips Cigarette card states Marshall's forename as being Lewis.

References

External links
Search for "Louis Marshall" at britishnewspaperarchive.co.uk
Search for "Lewis Marshall" at britishnewspaperarchive.co.uk
Search for "Lou Marshall" at britishnewspaperarchive.co.uk
Search for "Lew Marshall" at britishnewspaperarchive.co.uk

Bramley RLFC players
England national rugby league team players
English rugby league players
Leeds Rhinos players
Rugby league centres
Rugby league locks
Place of birth missing
Place of death missing
Year of birth missing
Year of death missing